Taipei University of Marine Technology (TUMT) is a private technological university located in Taiwan.

TUMT offers a wide range of undergraduate and graduate programs, including Bachelor’s and Master’s degrees in Marine Engineering, Naval Architecture, Marine Electrical and Electronic Engineering, Port and Shipping Management, and other related fields. TUMT also offers doctoral programs in Marine Technology, Marine Engineering, and Marine Science.

History
The university was originally established as China Maritime College. It was then upgraded to China Junior College of Maritime and Commerce and then to Taipei College of Maritime Technology. It was finally upgraded to Taipei University of Marine Technology. In 2020, the university had an enrollment rate of less than 60%.

Campus
TUMT has two campuses. One is located at Shilin District, Taipei and the other is at Tamsui District in New Taipei.

Faculties
 College of Shipping and Trade
 College of Human Ecology
 College of Electrical Engineering and Computer Science

The China Maritime College badge 

In early 1967, in order to meet the anniversary, China Maritime College faculty and students to study design many different versions of the badge final win was Liu Yiqin students whose design is accepted by the teachers and students as the school badge. 'Badge has been used from 1967 to 2007.  'original badge design is based on the initiation of the school with three departments: Navigation, Engineering and Shipping Management. The wheel is on behalf of the Navigation Division, gear representatives Engineer Branch and the ship is on behalf of Shipping Management. Three departments close together as the cornerstone of the China Maritime College founded, look to Octagon, as the cradle of culture Maritime talent proud of the spirit of the efforts for the reconstruction of the sea power of the Chinese nation status. Before finalization decided after discussion and voting, the ship is slightly modified into a fishtail type. newly established Fishing Branch is also included in the final seal designed. Highlight Maritime College be tolerant to diversity, the cohesion of the mind and solidarity.

Notable natives
 Jia Jia, singer and songwriter.

See also
 List of universities in Taiwan

References

External links

1965 establishments in Taiwan
Educational institutions established in 1965
Maritime colleges in Asia
Universities and colleges in Taipei
Universities and colleges in New Taipei
Universities and colleges in Taiwan
Technical universities and colleges in Taiwan